"Country Again" is a song recorded by American country music singer Thomas Rhett for his fifth studio album, Country Again: Side A (2021). The song was written by Rhett, Ashley Gorley, and Zach Crowell, while produced by Jesse Frasure and Dann Huff. It was released by Valory on April 12, 2021, as the second single from the album.

Background
Rhett accepted an interview, and said: “It’s one of my favorite songs I’ve written yet and honestly just feels full circle in so many ways… it’s about the crazy journey I’ve been on over the last decade and ultimately finding my way back home.”

Rhett told Billboard: “‘Country Again’ is not just a song title – it does represent 80-90% of this album. The song is about Rhett sharing quality time with friends and family, and suggests that the past year’s touring shutdowns have given him ample time to slow down and reconnect with loved ones and with himself.

Music video
The music video was released on April 13, 2021. It was directed by TK McKamy, who directed many of Rhett's previous music videos, including "Die a Happy Man", "Marry Me", and "What's Your Country Song". It shows Rhett performing the song with a guitar at an old warehouse.

Credits and personnel
Credits are adapted from the liner notes of Country Again: Side A.

Stuart Duncan fiddle
Paul Franklin steel guitar
Jesse Frasure programming
Dann Huff electric guitar, programming
David Huff programming
Charlie Judge B-3 organ
Chris Kimmerer drums
Justin Niebank programming
Josh Reedy background vocals
Thomas Rhett lead vocals
Jimmie Lee Sloas bass guitar
Ilya Toshinsky acoustic guitar, banjo
Derek Wells electric guitar

Charts

Weekly charts

Year-end charts

References

2021 singles
2021 songs
Thomas Rhett songs
Big Machine Records singles
Songs written by Ashley Gorley
Songs written by Thomas Rhett
Songs written by Zach Crowell
Song recordings produced by Dann Huff